Another Day of Life (Polish: Jeszcze dzień życia) is a non-fiction record of three months of the Angolan Civil War by the Polish writer Ryszard Kapuściński.

It is made up of a notable description of the degradation of the Angolan capital, Luanda, an analysis of the various weaknesses of the Popular Movement for the Liberation of Angola (MPLA) front, correspondence through Telex between Kapuściński and the Polish Press Agency and a brief history of the conflict in Angola until 1976.

The book was turned into a full-length animated documentary by the same name. Filming of the documentary part of the film started in the Autumn of 2013 in Poland, Angola, Portugal and Cuba. Released in 2018 and directed by Raul de la Fuente and Damian Nenow, Another Day of Life is a Polish, Spanish, German, Belgian and Hungarian co-production. The film premiered at the Cannes Film Festival of 2018.

References

1976 non-fiction books
Books about Africa
Books by Ryszard Kapuściński
Angolan Civil War
Non-fiction books adapted into films
Polish non-fiction books